You, Me and Dupree is a 2006 American comedy film directed by Anthony Russo and Joe Russo and written by Mike LeSieur. It stars Owen Wilson, Kate Hudson, Matt Dillon, Seth Rogen, Amanda Detmer, Todd Stashwick, and Michael Douglas.

The film revolves around newlyweds Carl and Molly Peterson (Dillon and Hudson). After Carl's best man and best friend Randolph "Randy" Dupree (Wilson) loses his job and home, the couple allow him to move in but Dupree overstays his welcome. Protective father Bob Thompson (Douglas) begins to dislike son-in-law Carl and works against him.

Plot
Molly Thompson and Carl Peterson are preparing for their wedding day in Hawaii, until Carl's friend Neil interrupts to say that best man Randolph Dupree is missing. They drive off together to pick up Dupree, who appeared to have hitched a ride with a light plane after landing on the wrong island. A day before the wedding, Molly's father, Bob Thompson, who is also CEO of the company that Carl works for, makes a toast with rude jokes about Carl, foreshadowing a conflict between the two. Later at a pre-celebration at a bar, Carl neglects Dupree to be with Molly. Carl and Dupree later make up on the beach, as Dupree apologizes for laughing at Bob's jokes. Carl and Molly get married. When Carl returns to work, he is surprised to find that Bob has promoted him to be in charge of a design he proposed, though it had been altered somewhat.

Bob makes absurd requests which proceed to get worse, starting with his drastic reimagining of Carl's new architecture project and that Carl get a vasectomy to prevent any future children with Molly. Before returning home to celebrate his promotion with Molly, Carl stops by the bar, where he finds Neil and Dupree. After Neil leaves, Dupree reveals that he has financial problems, such as being evicted from his home and losing his job and car. Carl and Molly take Dupree into their home, though clearly they are frustrated as he is a disruptive, messy slob. Molly sets up Dupree with a woman at her work, a primary school, who is a Mormon librarian. Dupree agrees, though Molly is shocked to find them having sex when she comes home from dinner. Romantic candles that Dupree had set up burn down the front of the living room, and Dupree is kicked out.

Meanwhile, Carl is continually stressed out from work, though he and Molly find time to go out for dinner. On the way back they find Dupree sitting on a bench in heavy rain with his belongings. Dupree reveals that the librarian had just dumped him. Feeling pity, Molly insists to a reluctant Carl that they take him back in. Dupree apologizes for being disruptive and agrees to mend his ways. The next day, Dupree makes amends, refurbishing the living room, and doing Carl's thank-you letters for their wedding gifts, as well as making friends with kids from the block. Dupree cooks a large dinner for Molly and Carl, though Carl is late again, so Molly and Dupree start without him. When Carl finally shows up, he is a little jealous that the pair were having dinner together and have become friends, and Carl and Molly have a fight. Carl kicks Dupree out, suspecting an affair, which shocks Dupree. The following night, Bob comes over for dinner. Dupree attempts to sneak back into their home to get some of his belongings, but falls off the roof. He is found outside and is invited in for dinner, much to Carl's dismay.

After Bob takes a liking to Dupree and asks him to go fishing with him, it enrages Carl because - even though he doesn't like fishing - it's Bob's way of approving someone. Carl's fury boils over as he then imagines Dupree hanging out with Bob and engaging in sex with Molly, causing Carl to jump across the table and attempting to strangle Dupree. Bob hits Carl over the head with a candlestick shortly after and Molly kicks Carl out of the house. After returning from the hospital with a neck brace, Dupree and Molly confront Bob about what he really thinks of Carl and his evasive answers reveal his dislike of him. The next morning, Dupree gets all the local kids to search for Carl. Dupree eventually finds Carl in the bar, and convinces him to chase after Molly. Dupree helps Carl break into Bob's office and confront him while Dupree himself distracts and evades a Samoan guard. Carl and Bob finally reach an understanding and Bob admits to his agenda of mistreatment. Dupree and Carl return to the house, where Carl apologizes to Molly and they agree to work it all out. Glad that he mended his best friend's marriage, Dupree celebrates by leaping into the air with joy until he falls to ground.

Dupree uses his experiences with Carl and Molly to publish a successful self-help book entitled 7 Different Kinds of Smoke: Living, Loving, and Finding your Inner "-ness" and becomes a motivational speaker. In a post-credits scene, Dupree's hero Lance Armstrong is seen reading Dupree's book and repeating "Lanceness" in various pronunciations.

Cast
 Owen Wilson as Randy Dupree
 Kate Hudson as Molly Peterson
 Matt Dillon as Carl Peterson
 Michael Douglas as Mr. Thompson
 Seth Rogen as Neil
 Amanda Detmer as Annie
 Todd Stashwick as Tony
 Bill Hader as Mark
 Lance Armstrong as himself
 Billy Gardell as Dave the bar keep
 Harry Dean Stanton as Curly (uncredited)
 Pat Crawford Brown as Aunt Kathy
 Sidney S. Liufau as Paco

Production
The film's production budget totalled $54 million. Composer Rolfe Kent scored the film, and at the very last minute—a mere week before the press screenings—his score was replaced by one written by Theodore Shapiro. The scene that has Dupree arriving by plane on the wrong island was shot in the same valley as Jurassic Park. In the special features of the film, there is a different version trailer of You, Me and Dupree where in the trailer Dupree and Molly are married and Carl moves in. The DVD release of the film also contains a re-cut trailer horror/thriller version of the film.

Reception

Critical response
You, Me and Dupree received negative reviews from critics. According to the review aggregator website Rotten Tomatoes, 20% of critics have given the film a positive review based on 166 reviews, with an average rating of 4.35/10. The site's critics consensus reads, "A rather generic entry into the arrested development subgenre, with themes borrowed from other more successful and funnier films. Dupree wears out its welcome." At Metacritic, the film has a weighted average score of 46 out of 100 based on 29 critics, indicating "mixed or average reviews".

Jim Emerson gave the film 2 stars out of 4, and compared the film to many other predecessors, suggesting Dupree is a 'descendant' of Dignan also played by Wilson in Bottle Rocket, and that the film is at times like a version of Fatal Attraction, but criticizes the film for never properly deciding if Dupree is merely unlucky or actually manipulative. Ebert describes the film as having an "Idiot Plot" requiring characters to behave in unnatural ways for laughs or to force the plot forward, the comedy equivalent of "Don't go down to the cellar!" in horror movies.

Box office
On release for 84 days, the film grossed $75,628,110 at the North American domestic box office, and in addition earned $54,803,258 in international markets, for a worldwide total of $130,431,368.

Steely Dan response
The film's title caused a minor stir as the uncommon name Dupree is the same as the title character in the Steely Dan song "Cousin Dupree" from their 2000 album Two Against Nature, which also concerns a ne'er-do-well relative who becomes a problem houseguest. Steely Dan founders Donald Fagen and Walter Becker wrote a tongue-in-cheek letter to Luke Wilson complaining about his brother Owen Wilson's apparent appropriation of their character's name. The duo invited the elder Wilson to make up for the "theft" of their character's name by coming on stage with them at one of their concerts to apologize to the band's fans. Owen Wilson gave a tongue-in-cheek response to the letter, stating in a press conference, "I have never heard the song 'Cousin Dupree' and I don't even know who this gentleman, Mr. Steely Dan, is. I hope this helps to clear things up and I can get back to concentrating on my new movie, HEY 19."

References

External links
 
 
 
 

2006 romantic comedy films
2006 films
American romantic comedy films
2000s English-language films
Films about weddings
Films directed by Anthony and Joe Russo
Films set in Hawaii
Films set in Los Angeles
Films shot in Los Angeles
Films produced by Scott Stuber
Films scored by Theodore Shapiro
Universal Pictures films
2000s American films